Schauble,  Schäuble is a surname. Notable people with the surname include:

Andrew Schauble (born 1976), Australian rules footballer
Jason Schauble (born 1975), American businessman
Martin Schäuble
Niko Schäuble
Thomas Schäuble
Wolfgang Schäuble (born 1942), German lawyer and politician